Lucas Abadamloora (December 22, 1938 – December 23, 2009) was the Catholic Bishop of the Diocese of Navrongo-Bolgatanga, Ghana.

Abadamloora was born near Navrongo, in the Upper East Region of Ghana.  Ordained to the priesthood on August 3, 1968, Abadamloora was appointed bishop of the Navrongo-Bolgatango Diocese of March 14, 1994, and was ordained bishop on June 29, 1994.

Published works
Ghana in the Wake of the Revolution: An Urgent Need for Christian Social Principles (1982)
Types of Mystical Experiences and Their Practical Aspects with Certain Allusions to the African Context (1986)

See also

References

External links

20th-century Roman Catholic bishops in Ghana
1938 births
2009 deaths
Tamale Senior High School alumni
Roman Catholic bishops of Navrongo–Bolgatanga
Ghanaian Roman Catholic bishops